This is a list of films which have placed number one at the weekend box office in the United Kingdom during 2003.

See also
 List of British films — British films by year

2003
United Kingdom
Box office number-one films